The Kaniadakis Logistic distribution (also known as κ-Logisticdistribution) is a generalized version of the Logistic distribution associated with the Kaniadakis statistics.  It is one example of a Kaniadakis distribution. The κ-Logistic probability distribution describes the population kinetics behavior of bosonic or fermionic character.

Definitions

Probability density function 
The Kaniadakis κ-Logistic distribution is a four-parameter family of continuous statistical distributions, which is part of a class of statistical distributions emerging from the Kaniadakis κ-statistics. This distribution has the following probability density function:

 

The Logistic distribution is recovered as

Cumulative distribution function 
The cumulative distribution function of κ-Logistic is given by

 

The cumulative Logistic distribution is recovered in the classical limit .

Survival and hazard functions 
The survival distribution function of κ-Logistic distribution is given by

 

The survival Logistic distribution is recovered in the classical limit .

The cumulative Kaniadakis κ-Logistic distribution is related to the hazard function by the following expression:

where  is the cumulative hazard function. The cumulative hazard function of the Logistic distribution is recovered in the classical limit .

Related distributions
The survival function of the κ-Logistic distribution represents the κ-deformation of the Fermi-Dirac function, and becomes a Fermi-Dirac distribution in the classical limit .
The κ-Logistic distribution is a generalization of the κ-Weibull distribution when .
The ordinary Logistic distribution is a particular case of a κ-Logistic distribution, when .

Applications 
The κ-Logistic distribution has been applied in several areas, such as:

 In quantum statistics, the survival function of the κ-Logistic distribution represents the most general expression of the Fermi-Dirac function, reducing to the Fermi-Dirac distribution in the limit .

See also 

 Giorgio Kaniadakis
 Kaniadakis statistics
 Kaniadakis distribution
 Kaniadakis κ-Exponential distribution
 Kaniadakis κ-Gaussian distribution
 Kaniadakis κ-Gamma distribution
 Kaniadakis κ-Weibull distribution
 Kaniadakis κ-Erlang distribution

References

External links
Kaniadakis Statistics on arXiv.org

Probability distributions
Mathematical and quantitative methods (economics)